Coll is an island in the Inner Hebrides of Scotland.

Coll may also refer to:

People
 Antonio Coll (born 1959), Spanish racing cyclist
 Catherine Coll (1856-1932), mother of Irish President Éamon de Valera
 Edna Coll (1906-2002), Puerto Rican educator and author
 Francisco Coll Guitart (1856-1875), Spanish saint 
 Francisco Coll (born 1985), Spanish composer
 Ivonne Coll (born 1947), Puerto Rican actress
 Jorge Coll, Spanish art dealer
 Joseph Clement Coll (1881-1921), American illustrator
 Lluís Coll (1937-2008), Spanish footballer
 Marcos Coll (born 1935), Colombian footballer
 Max Coll (1932-2014), American politician
 Mickey Coll (1951-1972), Puerto Rican basketball player
 Owen Coll (born 1976), Irish footballer
 Paul Coll (born 1992), New Zealand squash player
 Steve Coll (born 1958), American journalist and academic
 Tony Coll, New Zealand rugby player and coach

Places
 Coll, Lewis, a village on the island of Lewis and Harris in Scotland
 Cóll, a village in the municipality of Vall de Boí in Catalonia, Spain 
 Coll de Nargó, a municipality in the comarca of the Alt Urgell in Catalonia, Spain
 El Coll, a neighbourhood of Barcelona, Catalonia, Spain

Other uses
 Coll (letter), ninth letter of the Ogham alphabet
 Coll (character), character in The Chronicles of Prydain by Lloyd Alexander

See also
 Col (disambiguation)

Surnames from given names